Boston is an unincorporated community in Vermilion Parish, Louisiana, United States.

References

Unincorporated communities in Vermilion Parish, Louisiana
Unincorporated communities in Louisiana